Mack the Knife, also known as Dr. Mack, is a 1995 Hong Kong comedy-drama film written, produced and directed by Lee Chi-ngai, based on the manga Dr. Kumahige by Buronson and Takumi Nagaysu. The film stars Tony Leung, Sean Lau, Alex To, Christy Chung, Andy Hui, Hilary Tsui and Gigi Leung in her debut film role.

Plot
Dr. Mack Lau is a cynical person on the surface, but he is actually very delicate and has a strong insight of the world. He despises the injustice of the health care system and runs his own clinic in a red-light district. Indulged in medical science, Mack possess superior medical skills and is passionate in treating underprivileged citizens. Among his patients include a brave policeman, Chiu, his neighbor prostitutes and so on. Aside from healing his patient's wounds, Mack is also willing to listen to their thoughts and become their friend. However, Mack was later framed by his old friend and medical classmate, Roger Law, and must face the crisis of his doctor's license being revoked.

Cast
Tony Leung Chiu-wai as Dr. Mack Lau
Sean Lau as Chiu
Alex To as Dr. Roger Law
Christy Chung as Jamie
Andy Hui as Dr. Sam So
Hilary Tsui as Zin
Law Kar-ying as Wong Jau
Eileen Tung as Lok Mei
Richard Ng as Professor Pau
Jordan Chan as Tattoo Choir's conductor
Gigi Leung as May
Law Ka as May's dad
Lawrence Ng as K.T.
Jessica Chow as Fung
Wong He as Tiger
Farini Cheung as Nurse
Wyman Wong as Brother Fook
Jerry Lamb as Tong Ching
Wong Wa-wo as Secretary Fok
Winston Yeh as Hospital chief
Chan Siu-kwan as Hospital assistant chief
Louise Poon as Secretary
Mike Lau as Mikey
Jeff Lee as Student
Adrian Kwan as Tak
William To as Dr. Tony
Chan Ka-him as Kent
Ng Kwok-kan as Tattoo Choir's member
Tang Wing-yiu as Tattoo Choir's member
James Cheung as Tattoo Choir's member #2
Lee Wai-cheung as Tattoo Choir's member
Jacob Cheung as Tattoo Choir's member #4
Ben Luk as Tattoo Choir's member #5
Benny Tse as Tattoo Choir's member #6
Hau Ang as Fook's thug
Chang Yuk-chuen as Fook's thug
Samuel Leung as Fook's thug
Sin Min-kei as Fook's thug
Lee Fook-ching as Fook's thug
Chi Chi-ngai as Assassin
Wong Ching-wai as Assassin
Chu Ka-yin as Robber
Kwok Chi-cheung as Robber
Tsang Kit-ying as Chi
Emana Leung as Hooker
Tom Tom as Hooker
Chan Yin-ngai as Hooker
Jason Chu as Missionary
Lynn Levery as Missionary
James O'Connell as Missionary
Mike Staley as Missionary
Dianna Cassills as Missionary
Vastine Pettis as Missionary
Sharon Williams as Gospel singer
Jarry Hammond as Saxophone player
Ma Suk-lin as Wei
Lau Yan-leung as Cororner
Cheung Lai-kwan as Nurse
Yu Chun-fung as Reporter
Sue Ka-man as Chairman of Medical Review Board
Chan Chi-ban as Medical Review Board
Bo Chan as Medical Review Board
Stephen Wong as Chi's dad
Leung Kui as Uncle Ho
Marco Lo as Roger's student
June Chan as Roger's student
Ng Yuk-yin as Roger's student
Fuk Oi-yan as Roger's student

Reception

Critical
LoveHKFilm gave the film a positive review praising Lee Chi-ngai's direction and script as "sophisticated" and "affecting" as well as Tony Leung's performance. Hong Kong Film Net gave the film a score of 6 out of 10 praising the characters but criticizing the lack of story.

Box office
The film grossed HK$16,832,931 at the Hong Kong box office during its theatrical run from 17 February to 22 March 1995.

References

External links

Mack the Knife at Hong Kong Cinemagic

1995 films
1995 comedy-drama films
Hong Kong comedy-drama films
Medical-themed films
1990s Cantonese-language films
Films set in Hong Kong
Films shot in Hong Kong
Live-action films based on manga
1990s Hong Kong films